House Armed Services Subcommittee on Tactical Air and Land Forces is a subcommittee of the House Armed Services Committee in the United States House of Representatives.

The Chair of the subcommittee is Democrat Donald Norcross of New Jersey and its Ranking Member is Vicky Hartzler of Missouri.

Jurisdiction

The Air and Land Forces Subcommittee exercises oversight and legislative jurisdiction over:

 United States Army
 United States Air Force
 deep strike bombers
 Army and Air National Guard
 Army and Air Force Reserve
 ammunition programs.

Does not include strategic missiles, special operations and information technology programs.

Members, 117th Congress

Historical membership rosters

115th Congress

116th Congress

See also
U.S. Senate Armed Services Subcommittee on Airland

References

External links
House Armed Services Committee 
Subcommittee page 

Armed Services Air and Land Forces